Philip Smith VC (1829 – 16 January 1906) was an Irish recipient of the Victoria Cross, the highest and most prestigious award for gallantry in the face of the enemy that can be awarded to British and Commonwealth forces.

Details

He was 26 years old, and a corporal in the 17th Regiment (later the Leicestershire Regiment), British Army during the Siege of Sebastopol in the Crimean War when the following deed took place for which he was awarded the VC.
For repeatedly going out in the front of the advanced trenches against the Great Redan, on the 18th June, 1855, under a very heavy fire, after the column had retired from the assault, and bringing in wounded comrades.

Further information
Having achieved the rank of lance sergeant, he was later reduced to the ranks and when discharged he was a private. He died at Harolds Cross, Dublin on 16 January 1906 and was buried at Glasnevin Cemetery, Dublin.

The medal
His Victoria Cross is displayed at the Museum of the Royal Leicestershire Regiment now housed in the Newarke Houses Museum, Leicester, England.

References

Further reading
The Register of the Victoria Cross (1981, 1988 and 1997)

Ireland's VCs  (Dept of Economic Development, 1995)
Monuments to Courage (David Harvey, 1999)
Irish Winners of the Victoria Cross (Richard Doherty & David Truesdale, 2000)

1829 births
1906 deaths
19th-century Irish people
Irish soldiers in the British Army
Irish recipients of the Victoria Cross
British Army personnel of the Crimean War
Crimean War recipients of the Victoria Cross
Royal Leicestershire Regiment soldiers
People from County Cavan
Burials at Glasnevin Cemetery
British Army recipients of the Victoria Cross
Military personnel from County Cavan